Bushkill is an unincorporated community in Pike County, Pennsylvania, United States.

Portions of Bushkill were seized by the United States government during the controversial Tocks Island Dam project and are now part of the Delaware Water Gap National Recreation Area.

Bushkill's transportation options are somewhat limited. It is served by Monroe County Transit Authority's Yellow Line, and the Port Jervis Station just above the border of the State of New York and Pennsylvania, where U.S. Route 209 ends. The station is the terminal station of the New Jersey Transit's Port Jervis Line, and it is operated by the Metropolitan Transportation Authority's Metro-North Railroad. New Jersey Transit plans to re open the East Stroudsburg Station in nearby East Stroudsburg .

Notable person
Frank Schoonover - American artist who maintained a summer studio on Little Bushkill Creek

See also

 Camp Tamiment

References

Unincorporated communities in Pike County, Pennsylvania